Murgia is a village and concejo located in the municipality of Zuia, in Álava province, Basque Country, Spain. It is the capital of the municipality as well as of the Cuadrilla de Gorbeialdea.

The main road in the village is Domingo de Sautu Street. The Goba River separates a neighborhood called The Cross from the centre of the village. To the north is Sarria, to the northeast Zarate, to the southeast Jugo, to the southwest Bitoriano, and to the west Ametzaga.

Demographics

Notable people
 Mikel Landa (born 1989), cyclist
 Unai Simón (born 1997), footballer

References

External links
 

Concejos in Zuia